CNSS may refer to:

 Center for National Security Studies, a US non-governmental advocacy and research organization dedicated to protecting civil liberties.
 Committee on National Security Systems, a US government organization providing guidance for the security of national security systems.
 Compass Navigation Satellite System, a Chinese satellite navigation system